The 1977 San Diego Padres season was the 9th season in franchise history.

Offseason
 October 22, 1976: Diego Seguí was purchased from the Padres by the Seattle Mariners.
 November 5, 1976: Chuck Hartenstein was purchased from the Padres by the Toronto Blue Jays.
 December 14, 1976: Rollie Fingers was signed as a free agent by the Padres.
 December 14, 1976: Gene Tenace was signed as a free agent by the Padres.
 January 25, 1977: Mike Allen (minors) was traded by the Padres to the Houston Astros for Paul Siebert.

Regular season

Opening Day starters

Season standings

Record vs. opponents

Notable transactions
 May 17, 1977: Butch Metzger was traded by the Padres to the St. Louis Cardinals for John D'Acquisto and Pat Scanlon.
 June 7, 1977: 1977 Major League Baseball draft
Barry Evans was drafted by the Padres in the 2nd round.
Ozzie Smith was drafted by the Padres in the 4th round.
 June 15, 1977: Bobby Valentine and Paul Siebert were traded by the Padres to the New York Mets for Dave Kingman.
 September 29, 1977: Rick Sawyer was selected off waivers from the Padres by the Montreal Expos.

Roster

Player stats

Batting

Starters by position
Note: Pos = Position; G = Games played; AB = At bats; H = Hits; Avg. = Batting average; HR = Home runs; RBI = Runs batted in

Other batters
Note: G = Games played; AB = At bats; H = Hits; Avg. = Batting average; HR = Home runs; RBI = Runs batted in

Pitching

Starting pitchers
Note: G = Games pitched; IP = Innings pitched; W = Wins; L = Losses; ERA = Earned run average; SO = Strikeouts

Other pitchers
Note: G = Games pitched; IP = Innings pitched; W = Wins; L = Losses; ERA = Earned run average; SO = Strikeouts

Relief pitchers
Note: G = Games pitched; W = Wins; L = Losses; SV = Saves; ERA = Earned run average; SO = Strikeouts

Award winners

1977 Major League Baseball All-Star Game
 Dave Winfield

Farm system

References

External links
 1977 San Diego Padres team at Baseball-Reference
 1977 San Diego Padres team page at Baseball Almanac

San Diego Padres seasons
San Diego Padres season
San Diego Padres